Hans De Clercq (born 3 March 1969) is a Belgian former racing cyclist. He finished in last place in the 2003 Tour de France.

Major results

1991
3rd Kattekoers
1992
3rd Kattekoers
1995
2nd Kampioenschap van Vlaanderen
1997
2nd Circuit Franco-Belge
3rd Dwars door Vlaanderen
5th GP Rik Van Steenbergen
6th Overall KBC Driedaagse van De Panne-Koksijde
1998
2nd Kampioenschap van Vlaanderen
1999
9th Le Samyn
2000
1st Brussel-Ingooigem
5th Tro-Bro Léon
8th Grand Prix Midtbank
2001
1st Classic Haribo
1st Stage 2 KBC Driedaagse van De Panne-Koksijde
2nd Kuurne-Brussels-Kuurne
9th GP Stad Zottegem
2003
10th Druivenkoers Overijse

References

External links

1969 births
Living people
Belgian male cyclists
People from Deinze
Cyclists from East Flanders